The Hidden Words is the first and only studio album by British experimental band Fellsilent. Released on 25 August 2008 by Basick Records. The album was then released in North America on 3 March 2009 on the Sumerian Records label.

Karl Schubach of Misery Signals called the album one of the best of 2008.

Track listing

Personnel
Fell Silent
Neema Askari – vocals
John Browne – guitar
Max Robinson – bass
Christopher 'Noddy' Mansbridge – drums
Acle Kahney – guitar
Joe Garrett – vocals

References

2008 albums
Fellsilent albums